Isabel Bigley (February 23, 1926 – September 30, 2006) was an American actress. She originated the part of Sarah Brown in Frank Loesser's Guys and Dolls.

Biography

The Bronx-born Bigley's mother, a concert singer, guided her early interest in music, and her high school music teacher arranged for her to audition for a scholarship to the Juilliard School of Music in Manhattan, which she received.

She had been playing the role of Laurey in the London production of Oklahoma! in 1950 when she was offered the role of Sarah Brown, the "mission doll", in the original Broadway production of Guys and Dolls. For her performance, she received the Tony Award for Best Featured Actress in a Musical. In 1953 she starred as Jeanie, the chorus girl, in the Rodgers and Hammerstein show Me and Juliet, a role created especially for her.

She performed frequently in the early days of television in such shows as The Ed Sullivan Show and The Colgate Comedy Hour. On June 25, 1951, she appeared with other entertainers in a one-hour program on CBS that was the start of nationally broadcast color television.

Personal life
In 1953, she married Lawrence R. Barnett, then president of the Music Corporation of America. She retired in 1958 to raise their four sons and two daughters. She died in 2006, aged 80, from pulmonary disease at Cedars-Sinai Medical Center in Los Angeles. Her widower died on June 11, 2012, aged 98.

Barnett and Bigley made many charitable contributions to arts education, including establishing a graduate program in arts policy and administration at Ohio State University.

Bigley lived in both Los Angeles and Rancho Mirage and in 2005 she was named chairwoman of the board of the McCallum Theatre in Palm Desert.

References

External links
 
 

1926 births
2006 deaths
Actresses from New York City
American musical theatre actresses
Television personalities from California
American women television personalities
People from the Bronx
People from Rancho Mirage, California
Alumni of RADA
Television pioneers
Theatre World Award winners
Tony Award winners
Burials at Westwood Village Memorial Park Cemetery
20th-century American singers
20th-century American women singers
21st-century American women